Länsi-Suomi is a morning broadsheet newspaper published in Finland, based in Rauma.

History and profile
Länsi-Suomi was established in 1905. The paper is part of Marva Group and is based in Rauma. Until 1992 the paper supported the conservative Coalition Party.

As of 2009 Länsi-Suomi had a circulation of 16,833 copies. Its circulation was 14,391 copies in 2013.

References

External links

1905 establishments in Finland
Finnish-language newspapers
Mass media in Rauma, Finland
Daily newspapers published in Finland
Publications established in 1905